Tied islands, or land-tied islands as they are often known, are landforms consisting of an island that is connected to mainland or another island only by a tombolo: a spit of beach materials connected to land at both ends. St Ninian's Isle in the Shetland Islands off the north coast of Scotland is an example since it was once an island but is now linked to the mainland. Other examples include Maury Island, Washington, in the Puget Sound, Coronado, California; and Nahant, Massachusetts in the United States; Barrenjoey, New South Wales, in Australia; Paratutae Island, in New Zealand; Mount Hakodate in Japan, Howth Head, in Ireland; Wedge Island, in Western Australia; Cheung Chau, in Hong Kong; and Davaar Island, Campbeltown, Scotland.

The Isle of Portland, in England, is also described as a tied island, but geographers now believe that Chesil Beach, which connects the island to the mainland, is a barrier beach that has moved eastwards, rather than a tombolo, which would have been formed by the effect of the island on waves.

Paniquian Island, also known as Isla Boquete, is a tied island in Puerto Galera, a popular tourist destination in the Philippines. The island is connected to the main island of Mindoro by a small tombolo, which is submerged only a few times per year.

See also

References 
 Glossary of geology and related sciences.  Jesse V. Howell, American Geological Institute.  1962.
 Some Coastal Landform Definitions.  Matthew Flinders, Villanova College, Queensland.

External links

 
 Tied island
Islands by type